The 9th Aerobic Gymnastics European Championships was held in Elvas, Portugal, November 6–8, 2015.

Results

Medal table

References

External links
Official website

Aerobic Gymnastics European Championships
2015 in gymnastics
International gymnastics competitions hosted by Portugal
2015 in Portuguese sport